Kwilu is a province of the Democratic Republic of the Congo. It's one of the 21 provinces created in the 2015 repartitioning.  Kwilu,  Kwango, and Mai-Ndombe provinces are the result of the dismemberment of the former Bandundu province.  Kwilu was formed from the Kwilu district and the independently administered cities of Bandundu and Kikwit.  Bandundu is the provincial capital.

The province takes its name from the Kwilu River, which crosses it from south to north.

Administrative areas
Towns and territories are:
 Bagata
 Bulungu
 Gungu
 Idiofa
 Mangai
 Masi-Manimba

History
Kwilu was administered as a province from 1962 to 1966, however in 1964 the administration was taken over by the central government due to a rebellion in southwestern Congo. A rebel administration under Pierre Mulele ran most of Kwilu province from January 1964. The province was reconquered by the legal government in June 1965. The provincial government was restored on January 18, 1966, but the province was merged with Kwango District and Mai-Ndombe District to create Bandundu Province. 

President
 8 Sep 1962 - 18 Jan 1964 Norbert Leta
 Jan 1964 - Nov 1964 Pierre Mulele (b. 1929 - d. 1968)
 (commander-in-chief and Head of the General Direction)
Governor
 18 Jan 1966 - 25 Apr 1966 Henri-Désiré Takizala

Between 1966 and 2015, Kwilu was administered as a district as part of Bandundu Province.

References

 01
Provinces of the Democratic Republic of the Congo